is a Japanese fencer. He competed in the individual foil event at the 1992 Summer Olympics.

References

External links
 

1969 births
Living people
Japanese male foil fencers
Olympic fencers of Japan
Fencers at the 1992 Summer Olympics
Sportspeople from Ibaraki Prefecture
Asian Games medalists in fencing
Fencers at the 1994 Asian Games
Asian Games silver medalists for Japan
Asian Games bronze medalists for Japan
Medalists at the 1994 Asian Games
20th-century Japanese people
21st-century Japanese people